COSA is an acronym and may refer to:

Circles of Support and Accountability, are groups of volunteers with professional supervision to support sex offenders as they reintegrate into society after their release from incarceration
Committee on Sustainability Assessment, a non-profit global consortium of institutions, which uses participatory methods to pioneer the scientific measurement of sustainability in agriculture
COSA, a 12-step family program of Sex Addicts Anonymous
Children's Organization of Southeast Asia (COSA)
Colliery Officials and Staffs Area of the National Union of Mineworkers, a British trade union
Company of Science and Art

See also
Cosa